Mach 2 is a 2001 American direct-to-video action disaster thriller film directed by Fred Olen Ray. It was the first film to feature the airliner Concorde being hijacked.

Plot

U.S. Senator Stuart Davis, running against the Vice-President, plans a trip to the Balkans to negotiate the release of American servicemen being held hostage by terrorists.  Before he leaves, he receives a disk documenting evidence that the Vice-President has been trying to revive the American economy by causing a war in the Balkans.  He announces his plans at Washington Dulles International Airport to show it to both sides in the hopes of ending the situation.  He boards Concorde flight 209 to Paris along with some Air Force Officers and news employees.

Unexpected Secret Service agents turn up and board the Concorde.  After takeoff, the secret service agents led by Barry Rogers, shoot an Air Force officer and his men hijack the Concorde in mid-flight.  Barry takes Stuart and the others hostage and forces him to hand over the disk in order to prevent the war being averted. In the cockpit, Barry announces to the Dulles International Airport air traffic controller that the agents are armed with a nuclear device and threaten to crash the Concorde into Paris.

Air Force Officer, Jack Tyree, arrives at the cockpit, where Stuart is held hostage, and overpowers one of Barry's men, accidentally shooting the co-pilot in the process.  Jack helps fly the Concorde and later frees Stuart. Later, another agent arrives and shoots Captain Roman and takes Jack hostage.  Having brought with them two pairs of parachutes, the men jump off the plane, after revealing that there was no nuclear device aboard the aircraft.  The two men land and steal a car and escape along some cliffs.

Elsewhere, two French Secret Service Agents that have apparently overheard the hijacking, chase Rogers and his men down the road towards a pre-prepared road block.  Rogers sets an electromagnetic pulse bomb to destroy the French car, until the officer at the roadblock fires a shell at the agents. They skid off the road, violently roll down the cliffs and break up, killing Barry and his men instantly.

On the Concorde, Jack and news employee Shannon Carpenter attempt to fly the Concorde but Jack can't fly an aircraft and is nicknamed "washout".  The aircraft's radio is damaged due to the previous fight with one of Barry's men. Since Shannon is a former mechanic, she repairs the radio and restores contact with Paris Air Traffic control.  Meanwhile, with it having been rumoured that the agents planted a nuclear device on the Concorde, Dulles air traffic control orders a nearby aircraft carrier to launch a fighter aircraft to intercept the Concorde before it reaches Paris.  On the aircraft, Shannon announces to Dulles and Paris Orly airport that there is no device on the aircraft. She barely manages to order the fighter to abort, after two near misses from its missiles.  Because of the explosion of a nearby missile fired from the fighter, the Concorde's fuel line is torn and is leaking fuel, compromising the arrival at Paris.

With the plane low on fuel, Jack, is instructed via radio to land the Concorde at the airport. The landing is successful and the passengers depart safely.  Shannon, having hidden the actual disk in the trash, hands over the disk containing confidential files to Stuart, making it possible for the war to be averted.  Jack and Shannon finally engage in a passionate kiss and the film ends, displaying the Concorde.

Cast
Brian Bosworth ... Jack Tyree, an air force officer.
Shannon Whirry ... Shannon Carpenter, a former mechanic and news employee.
Cliff Robertson ... Vice President Pike
Bruce Weitz ... Phil Jefferson
Robert Pine ... Captain Roman
Andrew Stevens ... Commander Stevens
Michael Dorn ... Barry Rogers, leader of the Secret Service team that hijack the Concorde.
David Hedison ... Senator Stuart Davis, a presidential candidate.
Jennifer Hammon ... Gina Kendall
John Putch ... Tim Mandell, a news employee
Charles Cyphers ... Harry Olson
Ron Chaney ... Captain Wallace
Sondra Currie ... 	Courtney Davis, Stuart Davis' wife
Lance Guest ... Keith Dorman, a passenger
Austin Stoker ... Edwards
Jan Speck ... Linda Carson
Ai Wan ... Wendy Carson
Tom Simmons ... Ted
Clark Reiner ... Vice Presidential aide
Nikki Fritz ... Jill
Peter Looney ... Agent George Curtis
Grant Cramer ... Agent Lyndon
Richard Partlow ... Jefferson Baker, Jack Tyree's old friend and one of the agents.
Richard Gabai ... Co Pilot

Scenery

The scenes of the Concorde were used from the 1979 film The Concorde ... Airport '79. The interior was a full scale set replica of a Boeing 747's cabin, making the interior appear larger on the inside than the outside. If the cabin on the real Concorde was that size, its total length would have been over 120 meters and a total wingspan of at least 50 meters.The crew of a Concorde is 3 with an engineer seated behind the copilot and a vast array of controls. The scenes of the control tower was actually an aerodrome (a small airport) control tower, not the tower from the actual Washington Dulles International Airport, as seen because of its low height and small size. On the Concorde, there were many scenes of the United States Presidential Seal on the cabin divider walls. Several movie errors were shown: the steering column clearly shown onscreen is a vertical type, unlike Concorde's one is shaped like the letter "m". It also features advanced LCD primary flight displays, but Concorde's display is just dials or analog style, with the engineer seat and panel missing. This was also a wide body aircraft when in actual fact Concorde was a narrow body aircraft and very cramped. In final scene the aircraft's nose was in the up (supersonic) position which is incorrect and also the EMT ambulance has US plates as all of the background planes show US registrations

External links

 New info on Scenery reference is https://www.imdb.com/title/tt0222020/trivia?tab=gf&ref_=tt_trv_gf

2001 films
American aviation films
Films directed by Fred Olen Ray
2000s English-language films
2000s American films